George A. Siegmann (also credited as George Seigmann; February 8, 1882 – June 22, 1928) was an American actor and film director in the silent film era. His work includes roles in notable productions such as The Birth of a Nation (1915), Intolerance (1916), The Three Musketeers (1921), Oliver Twist (1922), The Cat and the Canary (1927), and The Man Who Laughs (1928).

Early life and career
Born in New York City in 1882, Siegmann is listed as having been in over 100 films. His more notable roles include Silas Lynch in D.W. Griffith's The Birth of a Nation (1915), Cyrus the Great in Intolerance (1916), Porthos in The Three Musketeers (1921), Bill Sikes in Oliver Twist (1922), the guard in the 1927 film The Cat and the Canary, and Dr. Hardquanonne in The Man Who Laughs, which was completed in 1927 but released in 1928. In 1919, Siegmann served as a director for Universal Pictures' production of the five-reel horror film The Trembling Hour starring Kenneth Harlan and Helen Eddy.

Personal life and death
Siegmann's career almost ended early, in 1915, when he was seriously injured while riding as a passenger in a car driven by fellow film actor and director Tod Browning. Browning collided at full speed with a "street work car loaded with iron rails", reportedly due to his not seeing that work vehicle's "rear lamp". Another actor, Elmer Booth, was a passenger as well in Browning's car. Booth died instantly, and Siegmann suffered four broken ribs, a deeply lacerated thigh, and internal injuries. Browning was badly injured too, including a shattered right leg and the loss of his front teeth.

Siegmann married at least twice. In 1917 he married 22-year-old Marguerite Webb, a native of Michigan. The length of their union is undetermined, although it presumably ended by divorce prior to his marriage to Maud Darby in 1927. That second marriage proved to be a relatively brief one, for the following year George, at age 46, died of pernicious anemia.

Filmography

 The Hessian Renegades (1909, Short) - Hessian (film debut)
 A Flash of Light (1910, Short) - Wedding Guest
 The Green-Eyed Devil (1914, Short)
 Brute Force (1914, Short)
 Home, Sweet Home (1914)
 The Lover's Gift (1914, Short) - Sheriff Reed
 The Angel of Contention (1914, Short) - Sheriff Magoon
 The Avenging Conscience (1914) - The Italian
 The Birth of a Nation (1915) - Silas Lynch - Mulatto Lieut. Governor
 A Yankee from the West (1915) - Sheriff Dick
 Intolerance (1916) - Cyrus (uncredited)
 Should She Obey? (1917) - Allegorical Types
 Grafters (1917) - The Menace
 The Little Yank (1917)
 Mother Love and the Law (1917) - William Bernard
 Hearts of the World (1918) - Von Strohm
 The Great Love (1918) - Mr. Seymour
 The Hawk's Trail (1919) - Quang Goo Hai
 The Spitfire of Seville (1919)
 The Trembling Hour (1919)
 The Untamed (1920) - Jim Silent
 Little Miss Rebellion (1920) - Col. Moro
 The Big Punch (1921) - Flash McGraw
 Partners of Fate (1921) - Purser
 A Connecticut Yankee in King Arthur's Court (1921) - Sir Sagramore
 The Queen of Sheba (1921) - King Armud of Sheba
 Desperate Trails (1921) - Sheriff Price
 Shame (1921) - Foo Chang
 The Three Musketeers (1921) - Porthos
 Silent Years (1921) - Pierre Gavot
 The Truthful Liar (1922) - Mark Potts
 Fools First (1922) - Spud Miller
 Monte Cristo (1922) - Luigi Vampa
 Oliver Twist (1922) - Bill Sikes
 Hungry Hearts (1922) - Rosenblatt
 A California Romance (1922) - Don Juan Diego
 Lost and Found on a South Sea Island (1923) - Faulke
 Slander the Woman (1923) - Scarborough
 Stepping Fast (1923) - 'Red' Pollock
 Merry-Go-Round (1923) - Schani Huber
 Scaramouche (1923) - Danton
 Hell's Hole (1923) - Conductor
 The Eagle's Feather (1923) - Van Brewen
 Jealous Husbands (1923) - 'Red' Lynch
 Anna Christie (1923) - Anna's Uncle
 Enemies of Children (1923)
 The Man Life Passed By (1923) - Crogan
 On Time (1924) - Wang Wu
 Singer Jim McKee (1924) - 'Brute' Bernstein
 Stolen Secrets (1924) - Nat Fox
 The Shooting of Dan McGrew (1924) - Jake Hubbel
 When a Girl Loves (1924) - Rogojin
 The Right of the Strongest (1924) - 'Trav' Williams
 The Guilty One (1924) - Captain
 Revelation (1924) - Hofer
 Janice Meredith (1924) - Colonel Rahl
 Manhattan (1924) - Bud McGinnis
 A Sainted Devil (1924) - El Tigre
 Recompense (1925) - Stenhouse
 Zander the Great (1925) - Black Bart
 Never the Twain Shall Meet (1925) - James Muggridge
 Pursued (1925) - John Grant
 Manhattan Madness (1925) - Dr. Harlan
 The Caretaker's Daughter (1925, Short) - The Gunman - Prospective Car Buyer
 The Red Kimono (1925) - Mr. Mack
 The Sporting Life (1925) - Limehouse Dan Crippen
 The Phantom Express (1925) - Rufus Hardy
 The Palace of Pleasure (1926) - Caesar
 The Midnight Sun (1926) - Ivan Kusmin - Banker
 My Old Dutch (1926) - Workhouse Superintendent
 Born to the West (1926) - Jesse Fillmore
 The Carnival Girl (1926) - Sigmund
 Poker Faces (1926) - George Dixon
 The Old Soak (1926) - Al
 Hotel Imperial (1927) - Gen. Juschkiewitsch
 The Red Mill (1927) - Willen
 The King of Kings (1927) - Barabbas
 The Cat and the Canary (1927) - The Guard
 Love Me and the World Is Mine (1927) - Porter
 Uncle Tom's Cabin (1927) - Simon Legree
 The Thirteenth Juror (1927) - The Politician, George Quinn
 Stop That Man! (1928) - 'Butch' Barker
 The Man Who Laughs (1928) - Dr. Hardquanonne (final film)

References

External links

 
 George Siegmann, 1922 passport photo

1882 births
1928 deaths
American male film actors
American male silent film actors
Male actors from New York City
20th-century American male actors
Burials at Calvary Cemetery (Los Angeles)